KRCI 89.5 FM is a radio station licensed to Pinetop-Lakeside, Arizona.  The station broadcasts a Christian format and is owned by Truth and Life Ministries.

References

External links
 KRCI's official website
 

RCI